Schuchuli, also known as Gunsight, Gunsight Ranch, Gunsight Well, and Sialatuk, is a populated place situated in Pima County, Arizona. Schuchuli became the official name of the location as a result of a decision by the Board on Geographic Names in 1941, and is derived from the Tohono O'odham s-cuculig, which means "many chickens".

References

Populated places in Pima County, Arizona
Tohono O'odham Nation